was a Japanese astronomer and professor at Kyoto University. He was director of the Kwasan Observatory in Kyoto.

Honors
Named after him:
 The crater Yamamoto on the Moon.
 Asteroid 2249 Yamamoto.

References

1889 births
1959 deaths
20th-century Japanese astronomers
Kyoto University alumni